The 2010 World Series of Poker was the 41st annual World Series of Poker (WSOP), held at the Rio All-Suite Hotel and Casino in Paradise, Nevada, and ran from May 28 to July 17. There were 57 bracelet events, culminating in the $10,000 No Limit Hold'em Championship that began on July 5. The November Nine concept returned for the third year, with the Main Event finalists returning on November 6.

A notable change from 2009 was the revamping of the $50,000 buy-in tournament. From its inception in 2006 through 2009, it had been a H.O.R.S.E. event in which play rotated between Texas hold 'em, Omaha 8-or-better, Razz, stud, and stud 8-or-better, all played with a limit betting structure. In 2010, it became an "8-game" tournament, rotating between the five H.O.R.S.E. games followed by rounds of no-limit hold 'em, pot-limit Omaha (high only), and limit 2–7 triple draw. Once the final table was reached, play switched exclusively to no-limit hold 'em (as was the case in the 2006 H.O.R.S.E. event). The tournament, now known as The Poker Player's Championship, was moved to the second spot on the WSOP schedule, preceded only by the restricted $500 Casino Employees No Limit Hold'em event.  Thus, the 2010 WSOP open events started with The Poker Player's Championship and ended with the No Limit Hold'em Championship/Main Event. Several celebrities were in attendance, including Ben Affleck, Matt Damon, and Ray Romano.

Event schedule

Achievements
Robert and Michael Mizrachi's appearance at the final table of the $50,000 Player's Championship is only the third time in WSOP history that two siblings faced each other at the final table of a WSOP event.  In 1995, Howard Lederer and Annie Duke made the final table in a pot-limit Hold'em event and in 2002, Ross and Barny Boatman made it to the final table in a pot-limit Omaha event.
While the event is called the "Ladies Championship," the WSOP cannot ban men from participating.  In past years, a few men have played in the Ladies Championship, but in 2010 at least half a dozen and "some estimates on the floor are that the number of men who entered the event is in the double digits."  WSOP Communications Director Seth Palansky called the men "scumbags" and declared, “The good news is at the World Series of Poker, we have the right to refuse service to anyone at any time at any point that we deem, as operators of the event.”
 Robert and Michael Mizrachi were also part of another sibling milestone. They and their brothers Eric and Donny became the first set of four siblings ever to cash in the same Main Event. Eric finished in 718th place on Day 4, Donny finished in 345th place on Day 5 and Robert finished in 116th place on Day 6, while Michael made the final table and played for the title in November, when he finished fifth.
 Breeze Zuckerman won the 2010 Last Woman Standing Cup in the Main Event, finishing 121st and cashing for $57,201.

Main Event
The $10,000 No Limit Texas Hold 'em Championship Main Event began on July 5 with the first of four starting days. Each of the participants at the 2010 WSOP Main Event received 30,000 in tournament chips for the $10,000 buy-in event.  After reaching the final table of nine players on July 17, the final table was delayed until November 6.

The total number of entrants in the 2010 Main Event was 7,319 with a prize pool of $68,798,600 with the winner receiving $8,944,138 for first place. The payout "bubble" was reached during Day 4 at 747 players, each of whom earned a minimum of $19,263. The bubble finisher (748th place) was Tim McDonald, a professional angler and recreational poker player from Lexington, Kentucky; he received the consolation prize of a guaranteed seat in the 2011 WSOP Main Event. Matt Affleck, with his 15th-place finish in this year’s championship combined with an 80th-place in 2009, outlasted 13,718 players in back-to-back years, which is the fourth-most in WSOP history. (Stefan Mattsson - 15,052 in 2006 & 2007, Humberto Brenes - 15,012 in 2006 & 2007, Joseph Hachem - 14,153 in 2005 & 2006)

The Main Event was a draw for many celebrities to play including: 

Day 1-a: Ray Romano, David Alan Grier, Sara Jean Underwood, Petter Northug, René Angélil, Irving Lorenzo
Day 1-b: Orel Hershiser
Day 1-c: Scott Ian, Shanna Moakler, Anthony Rapp, Sully Erna, Gabe Kaplan, Alexia Portal, Shane Warne
 
Day 1-d: Bruce Buffer, Shannon Elizabeth, Emmitt Smith, Audley Harrison, Hank Azaria, Jason Alexander, Trishelle Cannatella, Sam Simon, Jeff Fenech

Of these celebrities, Northug (653rd),  Fenech (585th), and Buffer (478th) made the money.

Performance of past champions

Other notable high finishes
NB: This list is restricted to top 30 finishers with an existing Wikipedia entry.

November Nine

*Career statistics prior to the beginning of the 2010 Main Event.

Final Table

Bracelet

American jewelry designer Steve Soffa was chosen by the World Series of Poker to design and manufacture the entire set of bracelets for the 2010 World Series of Poker.

References

World Series of Poker
2010 in poker